Jenny Sullivan is an American film and television actress. She has starred in some TV movies, and her best-known role is reporter Kristine Walsh in the 1983 miniseries V and its 1984 sequel V: The Final Battle.

Early years
Sullivan is the daughter of actor Barry Sullivan and his first wife Marie Brown, who performed in musicals on Broadway.

Career
Sullivan's first feature film was The Angry Breed (1968). Other film appearances include Plaza Suite (1971), The Other (1972), The Candidate (1972), Getting Straight (1970), Breakfast in Bed (1977) and Shadow of Doubt (1998).

Sullivan portrayed Barbara in the NBC comedy series Me and Maxx (1980). She has made guest appearances on TV shows, including Little House on the Prairie, Dragnet, Adam-12, The F.B.I., Highway to Heaven, Love, American Style, Dan August, Sanford and Son, Ironside, Falcon Crest, L.A. Law, All in the Family, Cannon, Hawaii Five-O, The Waltons, and The Fall Guy.

Sullivan wrote the play J for J (Journals for John) which was prompted after she found a packet of unsent letters (in 1995) written by her father decades earlier to her mentally disabled older brother Johnny (thus, journals for Johnny). The play premiered on October 20, 2001. John Ritter, who in real life had a disabled brother, played Johnny, Sullivan played herself, and Jeff Kober portrayed her father Barry.

Sullivan taught drama at the University of California at Santa Barbara.

Personal life
Sullivan was married to guitarist/producer Jim Messina during the heyday of the country rock duo Loggins and Messina. She is the former sister-in-law of songwriter Jimmy Webb, who was married to her half-sister (and former cover girl) Patricia.

Filmography

References

External links
  (official)

  (but see 3 records of recordings attributed to Jenny Sullivan, no year )

Living people
American film actresses
American television actresses
American theatre directors
Women theatre directors
Actresses from Los Angeles
20th-century American actresses
21st-century American women
Year of birth missing (living people)